Batu Sergeyevich Khasikov (born June 28, 1980) is a Russian politician, activist and former kickboxer, who serves as Head of the Republic of Kalmykia since 2019. He previously served as a Russian Federation Senator from 2012 to 2014 and Member of the People’s Khural from 2008 to 2012.

As a former professional kickboxer, he is a multiple world champion.

Personal life
He was born to an ethnically diverse family, with his father being a Kalmyk and his mother a Tatar. He is a Buddhist.

Khasikov is married. He has two children.

On 5 August 2020, Khasikov became one of the first Governors in Russia to be diagnosed with the novel coronavirus.

Education
Batu graduated from the Moscow State Pedagogical University, the faculty of physical culture. He continued postgraduate study in Russian Presidential Academy of National Economy and Public Administration (Candidate of political science, 2012). In February 2016, having considered the application of representatives of the Dissernet community, the Dissertation Council of Peoples' Friendship University of Russia cancelled Khasikov's PhD degree.

Career in sports
Khasikov was born in Moscow, and later in his childhood he moved to Lagan, in the Republic of Kalmykia. There he began training in Kyokushin at the age of 11. Having moved to Moscow in 1997, Batu kept training, and in 2000–2001 he won several Seiwakai and Kyokushin competitions. Khasikov then mastered hand-to-hand combat, Kickboxing, sambo, ju-jutsu and muay thai, and from 2005 competed in kickboxing on continuing basis.

In the course of 2005–2010 Batu became a three-time Russian champion (WAKO), WAKO European champion, and gained the championship belts in average weights. In October 2007, Batu defeated Ricardo Fernandes from Portugal (WAKO-Pro), in November 2007, he defeated Harris Norwood (ISKA), in and November 2010, he won a victory over Fabio Corelli (WKA).

In 2011, Khasikov defeated renowned kickboxers Albert Kraus and Mike Zambidis in K-1 (W5 World Champion title was gained).

On 4 May 2012 on MMA festival “The battle of Kalmykia” Batu Khasikov defeated Warren Stevelmans. In November of the same year, he won the K-1 WAKO-Pro title after defeating Mohammad Reza Nazari. On 3 November, at the "Battle of Moscow 8" event, Khasikov knocked out the popular Gago Drago.

On 24 March 2014 the “Battle of Moscow 15” Fight Nights promoter hosted an event in "Rossiya Luzhniki", where Khasikov and Mike Zambidis had a rematch fight, which was the main event of tournament. That fight was a matter of principle for both opponents. Before the fight, Khasikov announced that he would retire if he won the fight. For Zambidis, the fight was an opportunity to vindicate himself. The fight was a mighty sensation given Khaskov's status as a senator from the Republic of Kalmykia. From the start, Khasikov pressured Zambidis and controlled the fight throughout, but in the third round, Zambidis showed dangerous signs of retaliation. In a split decision, Khasikov won the fight. On Federation Council meeting, Khasikov was congratulated on victory.

Khasikov is the three-time hand-to-hand fight champion of the Main Department of Internal Affairs of the city of Moscow, while he had won more than 200 amateur fights.

Politics
From 2003 to 2008, Khasikov worked in police establishment. He holds the rank of a senior lieutenant. In March 2008, his duties changed course as a result of his election of Federation Council's member of the Republic of Kalmykia.

Khasikov is the leader of the "For a Healthy Country" civic organization. The function of organization is healthy lifestyle promotion. Today, the All-Russian Social Movement "For A Healthy country" organizes events in different cities on a regular basis.

Fight Nights
Khasikov is the promoter and co-founder of Eurasia Fight Nights. Fight Nights is a mixed martial arts (MMA) promotion in Russia which also promotes shows in other Russian-speaking countries. Its live events and competitions have been broadcast on Russia-2 and REN TV. Before appointment as Federation Council's member, Khasikov was a Fight Nights producer and a Fight Nights fighter.

Championships and awards 
 2014 WKN Super Welterweight Oriental Rules World Champion -72.6 kg
 2012 W.A.K.O. Pro World Champion -75 kg (Low kick rules)
 2011 W5 World Champion, 71 kg, Moscow (Russia), Fight Nights: Battle of Moscow 5;
 2010 WKA World Champion, -72.5 kg, Moscow (Russia), Battle of Champions 5;
 2010 W.A.K.O. Pro World Champion (Low kick rules), 71.8 kg, Moscow (Russia), Fight Nights: Battle of Moscow;
 2010 W.A.K.O. Amateur European Champion (Low kick rules), -71 kg, Baku (Azerbaijan);
 2007 ISKA World Champion, freestyle, light-middleweight 72.5 kg (man), Moscow (Russia);

Kickboxing record

|-  bgcolor="#CCFFCC"
| 2014-03-28 || Win ||align=left| Mike Zambidis || Fight Nights: Battle of Moscow 15 || Moscow, Russia ||  Decision (Split) || 5 || 3:00
|-
! style=background:white colspan=9 |
|-
|-  bgcolor="#CCFFCC"
| 2012-11-03 || Win ||align=left| Gago Drago || Battle of Moscow 8 || Moscow, Russia || KO (right cross) || 1 ||
|-  bgcolor="#CCFFCC"
| 2012-10-14 || Win ||align=left| Mohamed Reza Nazari || Team Russia vs. Team Asia || Khabarovsk, Russia || TKO (broken jaw) || 3 ||
|-
! style=background:white colspan=9 |
|-  bgcolor="#CCFFCC"
| 2012-05-04 || Win ||align=left| Warren Stevelmans || Battle in Kalmykia || Elista, Russia || Decision (Split) || 3 || 3:00
|-  bgcolor="#CCFFCC"
| 2011-11-05 || Win ||align=left| Mike Zambidis || W5 || Moscow, Russia || TKO (referee stoppage) || 1 || 1:51
|-
! style=background:white colspan=9 |
|-  bgcolor="CCFFCC"
| 2011-03-12 || Win ||align=left| Albert Kraus || Fight Nights: Battle of Moscow 3 || Moscow, Russia|| Decision (Unanimous) || 3 || 3:00
|-  bgcolor="CCFFCC"
| 2010-11-19 || Win ||align=left| Fabio Corelli || Battle of Champions 5 || Moscow, Russia|| KO || 2 || 
|-
! style=background:white colspan=9 |
|-  bgcolor="CCFFCC"
| 2010-06-05 || Win ||align=left| Ricardo Fernandes || Battle at Moscow || Moscow, Russia|| RTD || 3 || 2:16
|-
! style=background:white colspan=9 |
|-  bgcolor="FFBBBB"
| 2009-10-02 || Loss ||align=left| Ricardo Fernandes || Battle of Champions in Elista || Elista, Russia || Decision (Unanimous) || 3 || 3:00
|-
! style=background:white colspan=9 |
|-  bgcolor="CCFFCC"
| 2007-11-30 || Win ||align=left| Haris Norwood || Battle of Champions || Moscow, Russia|| KO || || 
|-
! style=background:white colspan=9 |
|-  bgcolor="CCFFCC"
| 2007-05-19 || Win ||align=left| Rizvan Isaev || Battle of Champions 2 || Moscow, Russia|| Decision (Unanimous) || 3 || 3:00
|-
|-
| colspan=9 | Legend:

Honours
Honoured worker of Physical Culture and Sport of the Republic of Kalmykia.

The owner of "Golden belt" of Russian Union of martial arts in nomination "The Brightest Victory of Year" (the 7-th national award ceremony).

Filmography
Shadowboxing 2: Revenge (Episode. 2007)
Shadowboxing 3: Last Round (2011)
The Film “Batu Khasikov before the fight” (Documentary, 2011)
The Film “Batu” (Documentary, 2012)
Red Hills (Series, 2013)
Warrior

See also
 List of male kickboxers

References

External links

Kalmyk sportspeople
1980 births
Russian male kickboxers
Russian male karateka
Middleweight kickboxers
Kyokushin kaikan practitioners
Russian jujutsuka
Sportspeople from Moscow
Russian people of Mongol descent
Russian people of Tatar descent
Oirats
Living people
Russian sportsperson-politicians
Russian people of Mongolian descent
Members of the Federation Council of Russia (after 2000)